Roundyella is an extinct genus of ostracod (seed shrimp) belonging to the order Leperditellocopida and family Scrobiculidae. Specimens have been found in beds of Devonian to Triassic age in Australia, Asia, Europe, North America, and South America.

Species 
Roundyella bellatula Bradfield 1935
Roundyella dorsopapillosa Sohn 1954
Roundyella kroemmelbeini Kozur 1985
Roundyella lebaensis Krommelbein 1958
Roundyella ludbrookae Fleming 1985
Roundyella neopapillosa Ishizaki 1964
Roundyella ovatiformis Hou 1954
Roundyella papilliformis Wang 1978
Roundyella simplex Girty 1910
Roundyella simplicissima Knight 1928

References 

Paleozoic life
Ostracods
Prehistoric ostracod genera